Mikaël Grenier (born October 17, 1992) is a Canadian racing driver from Stoneham-et-Tewkesbury.

Career
After karting, Grenier moved to Formula BMW Americas in 2008 with Apex-HBR Racing Team, finishing fourth in points with a pole at Road America and six podium finishes. In 2009 he made six starts in Star Mazda for Andersen Racing, good enough for 18th in points. In 2010 he drove the full Star Mazda schedule for Andersen and finished eighth in points, finishing second from the pole at O'Reilly Raceway Park at Indianapolis and winning from the pole in race one at Autobahn Country Club.

In 2011 Grenier made four Firestone Indy Lights starts O2 Racing Technology and one start for Team Moore Racing with a best finish of fifth at Barber Motorsports Park. He finished 16th in points. In 2013 he made a single start with Team Moore at Long Beach. He participated in his first IndyCar Series test with KV Racing Technology in November 2013 at Sebring Raceway.

He returned to racing in 2016 when he signed to drive in the Porsche Carrera Cup Italia with Tsunami Racing. After a 3rd-place finished in his first outing at Monza he consistently made top 5 with a few podium finishes. The last race of the season was the turning point of his season with a win at Mugello in damp conditions. This secured 4th place in the driver Championship on his return to racing after a 2-year absence.

For the 2023 season, Grenier joined Team Korthoff Motorsports in the IMSA SportsCar Championship, driving in the GTD class alongside Mike Skeen.

Racing Record

Career Summary

† Guest driver ineligible to score points

Star Mazda Championship

{| class="wikitable" style="text-align:center; font-size:90%"
! Year
! Team
! 1
! 2
! 3
! 4
! 5
! 6
! 7
! 8
! 9
! 10
! 11
! 12
! 13
! Rank
! Points
|-
| 2009
! Andersen Racing
| SEB
| style="background:#CFEAFF;"|VIR8
| style="background:#CFEAFF;"|MMP7
| style="background:#FFDF9F;"|NJ13
| style="background:#FFDF9F;"|NJ23
| style="background:#CFCFFF;"|WIS12
| IOW
| ILL 
| ILL 
| style="background:#DFFFDF;"|QUE4
| ONT 
| ATL 
| LAG 
| style="background:#CFCFFF;"| 18th
| style="background:#CFCFFF;"| 189
|-
| 2010
! Andersen Racing
|style="background:#DFFFDF;"| SEB4
|style="background:#CFEAFF;"| STP6
|style="background:#FFDF9F;"| LAG3
|style="background:#DFDFDF;"| ORP2
|style="background:#EFCFFF;"| IOW15
|style="background:#DFFFDF;"| NJ15
|style="background:#CFCFFF;"| NJ221
|style="background:#FFFFBF;"| ACC1
|style="background:#DFFFDF;"| ACC4
|style="background:#CFEAFF;"| TRO10
|style="background:#EFCFFF;"| ROA16
|style="background:#CFEAFF;"| MOS6
| ATL 
|style="background:#CFEAFF;"| 8th
|style="background:#CFEAFF;"| 366
|}

Indy Lights

Complete IMSA SportsCar Championship results
(key) (Races in bold indicate pole position; results in italics indicate fastest lap)

Complete Deutsche Tourenwagen Masters results
(key) (Races in bold indicate pole position) (Races in italics'' indicate fastest lap)

References

External links
Mikaël Grenier official website 

1992 births
Racing drivers from Quebec
Formula BMW USA drivers
Indy Pro 2000 Championship drivers
Indy Lights drivers
Living people
People from Capitale-Nationale
24 Hours of Daytona drivers
GT World Challenge America drivers
Mercedes-AMG Motorsport drivers
International GT Open drivers
Blancpain Endurance Series drivers
WeatherTech SportsCar Championship drivers
Asian Le Mans Series drivers
Team Moore Racing drivers
Emil Frey Racing drivers
Michelin Pilot Challenge drivers
Lamborghini Squadra Corse drivers
24H Series drivers
Lamborghini Super Trofeo drivers